Harold Hanger (1886 – 23 March 1918) was an English professional footballer who played as a centre half.

Career
Hanger was born in Kettering, Northamptonshire, and began his career with Kettering Town. He went on to play for Bradford City, Crystal Palace and Northampton Town.

For Bradford City, he made 73 appearances in the Football League; he also made six FA Cup appearances.

For Crystal Palace, he made 168 appearances in the Southern League; he also made 10 FA Cup appearances.

Hanger left Crystal Palace to undertake military service in World War I. He served as a private in the 5th Royal Irish Lancers and was killed in action in France on 23 March 1918. He is commemorated on the Pozières Memorial.

Personal life 
Hanger's brother Percy was also a footballer.

Sources

References

1886 births
English footballers
Kettering Town F.C. players
Bradford City A.F.C. players
Crystal Palace F.C. players
Northampton Town F.C. players
English Football League players
Southern Football League players
Southern Football League representative players
Association football wing halves
1918 deaths
Sportspeople from Kettering
British military personnel killed in World War I
British Army personnel of World War I
5th Royal Irish Lancers soldiers